The Klein Lauteraarhorn (3,737 m) is a peak of the Bernese Alps, overlooking the Unteraar Glacier in the canton of Bern. It lies south of the Lauteraarhorn, on the range separating the Strahlegg Glacier from the Lauteraar Glacier, both tributaries of the Unteraar Glacier.

References

External links
 Klein Lauteraarhorn on Hikr

Bernese Alps
Mountains of Switzerland
Mountains of the Alps
Alpine three-thousanders
Mountains of the canton of Bern